The Wayward Pines Trilogy (2012–2014) is a mystery/thriller/science fiction novel series by American author Blake Crouch. It follows U.S. Secret Service agent Ethan Burke as he unravels the mystery surrounding his unanticipated arrival in the small town of Wayward Pines, Idaho, following a devastating car accident. The novels are Pines (2012), Wayward (2013), and The Last Town (2014). In 2015, the novels were adapted into the television series Wayward Pines.

Overview
The plot surrounds Secret Service agent Ethan Burke's introduction to the remote small town of Wayward Pines, his new home from which he cannot escape. The residents of this picturesque town don't know how they got there and are forbidden to talk about their prior lives. An electric fence surrounds the town, and the residents are under 24-hour surveillance. The mysteries and horrors of the town build until Ethan discovers its secret. Then he must do his part to keep Wayward Pines protected from threats both within and beyond the fence.

The series covers themes of isolation, bucolic Americana, time-displacement, man vs nature, human evolution, and cryonics. Crouch has acknowledged that he was inspired by the 1990–91 TV series Twin Peaks.

Books

Reception
Ryan Daley of Bloody Disgusting named Pines one of his Top 10 Novels of 2012. He later called Wayward "riveting" and even better than Pines.<ref>{{cite web|last1=Daley|first1=Ryan|title='Wayward Is So Good, Not Even M. Night Can Screw It Up|url=http://bloody-disgusting.com/news/3252850/book-review-wayward-is-so-good-not-even-m-night-can-screw-it-up/|publisher=Bloody Disgusting|access-date=June 8, 2015|date=September 11, 2013}}</ref>

Adaptation

The novels are the basis for the television series Wayward Pines, produced by M. Night Shyamalan. After reading the source material, he said of the project, "As long as everybody isn't dead, I'm in", his "only rule" to secure his participation. The "big reveal" at the end of Pines is reached  halfway through the series in the fifth episode, and the remaining five episodes cover the events of Wayward and The Last Town''. Shyamalan noted that the TV series varies from the books in some ways, but as Crouch was still writing the novels while the show was in development, there were "all kinds of cross pollinating" between the two. In December 2015, Fox renewed the series for a second season.

References

External links
 
 
 

Mystery novels by series
American novels adapted into television shows
Science fiction book series
Science fiction novel trilogies
Thriller novel series